Hiner may refer to:

People
Cynthia Hiner, an American politician
William Hiner, an American politician

Places
Hiner, Kentucky, a community in Perry County